Reunert is a surname and given name, likely of South African origin. Notable people with the surname or given name include:

Surname
Clive Reunert (1887-1953), South African first-class cricketer and barrister
John Reunert (1886-1946), South African first-class cricketer

Given name
Ronnie Bauser (1928-2017), real name Reunert Bauser, South African rugby union player

See also
Reinert